Pierre-Jean David (12 March 1788 – 4 January 1856) was a French sculptor, medalist and active freemason. He adopted the name David d'Angers, following his entry into the studio of the painter Jacques-Louis David in 1809 as a way of both expressing his patrimony and distinguishing himself from the master painter.

Biography

He was born in Angers in 1788. His father was a wood carver and ornamental sculptor, who had joined the volunteer Republican army as a musketeer, fighting against the Chouans of La Vendée. He studied in the studio of Jean-Jacques Delusse and in 1808 traveled to Paris to study in the studio of Philippe-Laurent Roland.

While in Paris he did work both on the Arc de Triomphe and the exterior of the Louvre. In 1810 he succeeded in taking the second place prize at the École des Beaux-Arts for his Othryades. In 1811 David's La Douleur won the École's competition for tête d'expression followed by his taking of the Prix de Rome for his Epaminondas in the same year. He spent five years in Rome, during which time he frequented the studio of Antonio Canova and made small trips around Italy to Venice, Naples and Florence.

Returning from Rome around the time of the restoration of the Bourbons and their accompanying foreign conquerors and returned royalists, David d'Angers would not remain in the neighborhood of the Tuileries, opting instead to travel to London. Here John Flaxman and others took him to task for the political sins of David the painter, to whom he was erroneously supposed to be related.

With great difficulty he made his way to Paris again, where a comparatively prosperous career opened before him. His medallions and busts were in much request, as well as orders for monumental works. One of the most famous of these was that of Gutenberg at Strassburg; but those he himself valued most were the statue of Barra (Joseph Bara), a drummer boy who purportedly continued to beat his drum until the moment of death in the war in La Vendée, and the monument to the Greek liberator Markos Botsaris. 

David's busts and medallions were very numerous, and among his sitters may be found not only the illustrious men and women of France, but many others both of England and Germany countries which he visited professionally in 1827 and 1829. His medallions number over 500.

David's fame rests firmly on his pedimental sculpture for the Pantheon, his marble Wounded Philopoemen in the Louvre and his equestrian monument to General Jacques-Nicolas Gobert in Père Lachaise Cemetery. In addition to that of Gobert, he did sculptures for seven other tombs at Père Lachaise, including the bronze busts of writer Honoré de Balzac and physician Samuel Hahnemann.

In the Musée David in Angers is an almost complete collection of his works either in the form of copies or in the original moulds. As an example of his benevolence of character may be mentioned his rushing off to the sickbed of Rouget de Lisle, the author of the Marseillaise Hymn, modelling and carving him in marble without delay, making a lottery of the work, and sending to the poet in the extremity of need the proceeds.

Of Reviving Greece, his monument to the Greek liberator Markos Botsaris, showing a Greek child reading his name, Victor Hugo said, "It is difficult to see anything more beautiful in the world; this statue joins the grandeur of Pheidias to the expressive manner of Puget."

Museums 

 David d'Angers gallery, Musée des Beaux-Arts, Angers
 Musée Carnavalet, Paris
 Musée de la Vie romantique, Paris

Selected works

Notes

References

Attribution

See also
 Pierre-Jean David d'Angers (French Wikipedia)

External links
 

1788 births
1856 deaths
People from Angers
Politicians from Pays de la Loire
French republicans
Members of the 1848 Constituent Assembly
19th-century French sculptors
French male sculptors
French Freemasons
Prix de Rome for sculpture
Members of the Académie des beaux-arts
Burials at Père Lachaise Cemetery
Artists of the Boston Public Library
19th-century French male artists